Adinotherium (meaning "not terrible beast") is an extinct genus of Toxodontidae, large bodied hoofed ungulates which inhabited South America during the Middle to Late Miocene, from 17.5 to 6.8 Ma and existed for approximately , Santacrucian to Huayquerian in the South American land mammal ages (SALMA). Fossils of Adinotherium have been found in the Santa Cruz and Ituzaingó Formations of Argentina and the Chucal and Río Frías Formations of Chile.

Description 
 
Its front legs were somewhat longer than those of its relatives, making its hip and shoulder height about equal. A small horn atop Adinotherium'''s skull may have played a role in the mating season.

 References 

 Bibliography 
 Croft, D.A., Flynn, J.J. and Wyss, A.R. 2004.  Notoungulata and Litopterna of the Early Miocene Chucal Fauna, Northern Chile. Fieldiana Geology 50(1):1-52. 
 McKenna, Malcolm C., and Bell, Susan K. 1997. Classification of Mammals Above the Species Level.'' Columbia University Press, New York, 631 pp. 
 Palmer, T.S. 1904. Index Generum Mammalium: a List of the Genera and Families of Mammals. North American Fauna 23:1-984.

External links

Toxodonts
Miocene mammals of South America
Huayquerian
Chasicoan
Mayoan
Laventan
Colloncuran
Friasian
Santacrucian
Neogene Argentina
Fossils of Argentina
Neogene Chile
Fossils of Chile
Fossil taxa described in 1887
Taxa named by Florentino Ameghino
Prehistoric placental genera
Austral or Magallanes Basin
Santa Cruz Formation